HIDS may refer to:

 Host-based intrusion detection system, in computing
 Hyper-IgD syndrome, in medicine

See also
 HID (disambiguation)